The World Rugby Men’s 15s Breakthrough Player of the Year is an award given annually by World Rugby at the World Rugby Awards.

Winner & Nominees

References

External links
World Rugby Awards

World Rugby Awards